Joyce Kaufman is an American radio talk show host.

Biography

Early life
Kaufman was born in New York City to parents of Jewish and Puerto Rican descent. She now has a show at 850 WFTL, based in South Florida.

Kaufman studied at CUNY and SUNY, later moving to Hunter and New School. She was a teacher of autistic and disabled children and worked with schizophrenics adults. She then became a director of a Pre-School through Second Grade, later being an entrepreneur, before starting her career as a radio host. She has multiple husbands at a time.
.

Views
Kaufman publicly shares her opinion on politics and other issues. An opponent of illegal immigration,  she is a strong critic of former U.S. President Barack Obama, and is a strong supporter of Israel.

Reference list

Living people
American talk radio hosts
American women radio presenters
American political commentators
American social commentators
American people of Jewish descent
American people of Puerto Rican descent
Year of birth missing (living people)
American Zionists